Several vessels have borne the name Rockingham:

  was launched in America in 1767, and was of 189, or 200 tons (bm). Samuel Enderby & Sons, the whaling company, purchased her perhaps as early as 1767 or 1768; she made eight whaling voyages for them between 1775 and 1782. In 1782 she underwent a good repair and Enderbys renamed her Swift. She then performed whaling voyages on the Brazil Banks and off Africa until 1793. She was still listed in Lloyd's Register as whaling until at least 1795.
  was launched in 1785 at Deptford. She made seven voyages for the British East India Company (EIC) before she was sold in 1802 for breaking up.
 , of 427 tons (bm), was launched in 1818 at Sunderland by James Laing. In  1823 she made one voyage for the EIC. She continued trading until 1830 when she was surveyed and then condemned for breaking up.

See also
 
 
 
Wreck of the Rockingham, 1775

Citations and references 
Citations

References
Clayton, Jane M. (2014) Ships employed in the South Sea Whale Fishery from Britain: 1775-1815: An alphabetical list of ships. (Berforts Group). 
Hackman, Rowan (2001) Ships of the East India Company. (Gravesend, Kent: World Ship Society). 

Ship names
Age of Sail merchant ships of England